Ozbak (also known as Ūzbak) is a village in Sarajuy-ye Gharbi Rural District, in the Central District of Maragheh County, East Azerbaijan Province, Iran. At the 2006 census, its population was 173, in 37 families.

References 

Towns and villages in Maragheh County